László Szabó (4 November 1934 – 16 May 2020) was a Grand Prix motorcycle road racer from Hungary. He had his best year in 1970 when he finished the year in fifth place in the 125cc world championship.

References 

1934 births
2020 deaths
Hungarian motorcycle racers
125cc World Championship riders
250cc World Championship riders
350cc World Championship riders